The 1976 United States presidential election in North Dakota took place on November 2, 1976, as part of the 1976 United States presidential election. Voters chose three representatives, or electors, to the Electoral College, who voted for president and vice president.

North Dakota was won by the Republican candidate and incumbent President, Gerald Ford, with 51.66% of the popular vote, against the Democratic candidate, Jimmy Carter, with 45.80% of the popular vote. American Party candidate Thomas Anderson finished highest among third parties; finishing with 1.24% of North Dakota's popular vote.

Despite losing in North Dakota, Carter went on to win the national election and became the 39th president of the United States. , this is the last election in which Morton County, Walsh County, McLean County, Pierce County, Cavalier County, Emmons County, Dunn County, Foster County, Renville County, Griggs County, and Adams County voted for a Democratic presidential candidate.

Results

Results by county

See also
 United States presidential elections in North Dakota

References

North Dakota
1976
presidential